The Academy Award-Winning "Call Me Irresponsible" and Other Hit Songs from the Movies is the fourteenth studio album by American pop singer Andy Williams and was released in the spring of 1964 by Columbia Records. Williams had already had great success with his albums named after Henry Mancini's Oscar winners from 1961 and 1962, "Moon River" and "Days of Wine and Roses", and was asked to sing Mancini and Johnny Mercer's title song collaboration  from the 1963 film Charade at the Academy Awards on April 13, 1964, after it was nominated for Best Original Song, but the winner that year was the other song that Williams performed at the ceremony, "Call Me Irresponsible".

The album made its first appearance on Billboard magazine's Top LP's chart in the issue dated May 9 of that year and remained on the album chart for 63 weeks, peaking at number five. It received Gold certification from the Recording Industry Association of America on December 18, 1964.

As the B-side of the single "A Fool Never Learns," the album's opening track, "Charade", made its debut on the Billboard Hot 100 on January 18, 1964, spending its only week on the chart at number 100.

The album was released on compact disc for the first time as one of two albums on one CD by Collectables Records on March 23, 1999, the other album being Williams's Columbia album from September 1964, The Great Songs from "My Fair Lady" and Other Broadway Hits.  This same pairing was also released as two albums on one CD by Sony Music Distribution in 2000. The Collectables CD was included in a box set entitled Classic Album Collection, Vol. 1, which contains 17 of his studio albums and three compilations and was released on June 26, 2001.

Reception

William Ruhlmann of Allmusic was complimentary. "The songs tended to be evocative of a mood rather than specific, and Williams's warm, yet homogenized approach, backed by sympathetic orchestral arrangements with occasional vocal choruses, brought out their haunting, romantic qualities." He even singled out specific tracks. "Especially impressive here were 'Laura,' a version of 'Gigi' with the introductory verse, and a restrained (well, compared to Mario Lanza) 'Be My Love.' But the whole album suggested that Williams and movie songs remained perfect partners."

In their capsule review at the time of its release, Billboard magazine described the album as a "fine collection" and noted that "Andy's singing is most enjoyable".

Track listing

Side one
 "Charade" (Henry Mancini, Johnny Mercer) – 2:35
 "Mona Lisa" (Ray Evans, Jay Livingston) – 2:54
 "Call Me Irresponsible" (Sammy Cahn, Jimmy Van Heusen) – 3:10
 "I'll Never Stop Loving You" (Nicholas Brodszky, Cahn) – 2:38
 "Madrigal" (Malcolm Arnold, Mack David) – 3:11
 "Be My Love" (Nicholas Brodszky, Cahn) – 3:15

Side two
 "More" (Norman Newell, Nino Oliviero, Riz Ortolani) – 2:32
 "Laura" (Mercer, David Raksin) – 2:50
 "Anniversary Song" (Saul Chaplin, Al Jolson) – 2:58
 "Gigi" (Alan Jay Lerner, Frederick Loewe) – 4:07
 "The Song from Moulin Rouge" (Georges Auric, William Engvick) – 2:26
 "Love Letters" (Edward Heyman, Victor Young) – 2:57

Grammy nominations
This album brought the fifth of six Grammy nominations that Williams received over the course of his career, this time in the category for Best Vocal Performance, Male. This nomination did not focus on the performance of a particular song but rather Williams's performance of the album as a whole. The winner was Louis Armstrong for the single "Hello, Dolly!", a song that Williams went on to record on his next album, The Great Songs from "My Fair Lady" and Other Broadway Hits.

Personnel
From the liner notes for the original album:

Andy Williams – vocals
Robert Mersey - arranger (except as noted), conductor, producer
Dave Grusin - arranger ("More")
Henry Beau - arranger ("Call Me Irresponsible")
Frank Bez - photography

References

Bibliography

1964 albums
Andy Williams albums
Columbia Records albums
Albums arranged by Dave Grusin
Albums arranged by Henry Beau